Gabriel Parra (1947–1988) was the drummer of Chilean folk group Los Jaivas. He was the youngest of the three Parra brothers who formed the band.

He died in a crash in Peru in 1988. After this accident, his daughter Juanita Parra replaced him as drummer in Los Jaivas.

Notoriety 
He is widely considered to be the top drummer from Chile, with a unique and strong style.
In 1979 Los Jaivas toured England for the first time. They played at the Shaftesbury Theatre in London, where they were seen by a writer from Music Week. He later wrote that Gabriel Parra was one of the ten top drummers in the world.

See also 
 Chilean rock
 Los Jaivas

References 

1947 births
1988 deaths
Chilean folk singers
Musicians from Valparaíso
20th-century Chilean male singers
20th-century drummers
Chilean drummers
20th-century Chilean male artists